Scott Brown may refer to:

Sportsmen
Scott Brown (American football), American college football coach of Kentucky State
Scott Brown (baseball) (born 1956), former Major League Baseball pitcher for the Cincinnati Reds
Scott Brown (footballer, born April 1985), English footballer (goalkeeper)
Scott Brown (footballer, born May 1985), English footballer
Scott Brown (footballer, born June 1985), Scottish footballer for Hibernian, Celtic and Scotland
Scott Brown (footballer, born 1994), Scottish footballer for Clyde and Bradford City
Scott Brown (golfer) (born 1983), American professional golfer
Scott Brown (gymnast) (born 1983), Australian trampolinist

Others
Scott Brown (bassist), Canadian bassist of the rock band Trooper
Scott Brown (broadcaster), Scottish television producer
Scott Brown (DJ) (born 1972), Scottish disc jockey
Scott Brown (politician) (born 1959), former U.S. Ambassador to New Zealand and Samoa; former United States Senator
Scott Brown (Royal Navy chaplain) (born 1968), Chaplain of the Fleet of the Royal Navy
Scott Brown (writer), American author, screenwriter, critic, and composer
Scott G. Brown (born 1966), Canadian scholar
Scott O. Brown (born 1975), American writer and publisher
Scott Wesley Brown (born 1952), American singer and songwriter
Scott T. Brown, American pastor and author, proponent of the Family integrated church
Scott Brown, character in The OA

See also
Archie Scott Brown (1927–1958), British racing driver
Denise Scott Brown (born 1931), Rhodesian-American architect
Scott Brow (born 1969), former American baseball pitcher